Self-Portrait is a small oil on panel painting by Sofonisba Anguissola, signed and dated 1554 on the open book held by the artist. It is now in the Kunsthistorisches Museum in Vienna.

It was recorded as hanging in Vienna's Belvedere Gallery, already attributed to Anguissola but initially thought to be a portrait of infanta Isabella Clara Eugenia on her betrothal to her cousin Albert VII, Archduke of Austria which had therefore ended up in Vienna. Flavio Carioli also came to this conclusion, but in 1885 Adolfo Venturi cited a letter sent to Ercole II d'Este, Duke of Ferrara in March 1556 by Anguissola's father with two paintings by her, a self-portrait intended for the duke's daughter Lucrezia and a Cleopatra (after a drawing by Michelangelo, probably a folio now in the Casa Buonarroti). Venturi also recorded that in 1603-1604 cardinal Alessandro d'Este gave some of his paintings to Rudolf II, Holy Roman Emperor. Though no inventory of the paintings given to Rudolf survives, Venturi theorises that this self-portrait was one of them and the theory is accepted by all other art historians.

References

1554 paintings
Self
Anguissola
Anguissola
Paintings in the collection of the Kunsthistorisches Museum